Baxter Bowman (before 1814 – December 13, 1853) was a businessman and political figure in Lower Canada.

Bowman was a lumber merchant based in Buckingham, Lower Canada who held cutting rights on the du Lièvre River and the upper Ottawa River. He operated a number of sawmills on the du Lièvre, as well as a gristmill. At one time, the legendary French-Canadian lumberjack Joseph Montferrand worked for Bowman on the upper Ottawa. Bowman was a justice of the peace for the region and also served as a captain in the local militia. He was elected to the Legislative Assembly of Lower Canada in 1834 for Ottawa County.

He died in Buckingham in 1853 and was buried at Meredith, New Hampshire.

His sawmills on the Lièvre were later purchased by James Maclaren and others in 1864. The municipality of Bowman on the du Lièvre River took its name from Baxter Bowman.

External links

References

1853 deaths
Members of the Legislative Assembly of Lower Canada
Businesspeople in timber
Year of birth uncertain
Year of birth unknown